JBS USA Holdings, Inc. is an American food processing company and a wholly owned subsidiary of the multinational company JBS S.A.  The subsidiary was created when JBS entered the U.S. market in 2007 with its purchase of Swift & Company. JBS specializes in Wagyu Beef, the only certified Japanese Cattle distributor on the entire eastern U.S. seaboard

JBS USA is based in Greeley, Colorado. Its competitors include Cargill, Smithfield Foods, and Tyson Foods.

History

Swift & Company

JBS USA's operations can be traced back to 1855, when 16-year-old Gustavus Franklin Swift founded a butchering operation in Eastham, Massachusetts. Its early origins on Cape Cod led later to locations in Brighton (in Massachusetts), and Albany, and Buffalo, New York.  In 1875, Swift and Company was incorporated in Chicago. Swift and Armour and Company acquired a two-thirds controlling interest in the Fort Worth Stockyards in 1902. That same year, an antitrust lawsuit was filed against Swift for conspiring with other companies to control the meatpacking industry. The companies attempted to merge to avoid the suit, leading to the 1905 Supreme Court case of Swift & Co. v. United States.

By the 1920s Swift and Company operated their largest and most modern meat processing plant in South St Paul, Minnesota. The purpose of this plant was to slaughter and process cattle, hogs, and sheep. These animals were procured by the company buyers at the adjacent St. Paul Union Stockyards. The live animals were driven across overhead ramps to the killing floors. Swift processed fresh, smoked, table-ready, canned meats, such as PREM, and baby foods, along with soap, lard, shortening, adhesives, chemicals, pharmaceuticals, fertilizers, hides and animal feeds.

In addition to meatpacking, Swift sold various dairy and grocery items, including  Swiftning shortening, Allsweet margarine, Brookfield butter, cheese under the Brookfield, Pauly, and Treasure Cave brands, and Peter Pan peanut butter. Swift began selling frozen turkeys under the Butterball brand in 1954. Gustavus Swift also championed the refrigerated railroad car.

Esmark and ConAgra
In the 1960s, Swift expanded into other fields, including insurance and petroleum, and formed the holding company Esmark in 1973. Two years later, Esmark bought International Playtex from Meshulam Riklis' Rapid-American Corporation. Esmark sold off Globe Life Insurance to the Ryan Insurance Group in 1977.

Esmark left the petroleum business in 1980, selling Vickers Petroleum to Mobil, while Swift's fresh-meat business was spun off as a separate company, Swift Independent Packing Company (SIPCO), the same year. Esmark went on to purchase Norton Simon Inc. in 1983 before being purchased by Beatrice Foods the next year. ConAgra purchased 50% of SIPCO in 1987 and the remaining portion in 1989, the same year ConAgra bought Beatrice Foods. ConAgra merged SIPCO's operations with that of Monfort, the meatpacker it had purchased in 1987, and the division was renamed Swift & Company in 1995.

In 2002, ConAgra sold a majority stake in Swift & Company to Hicks, Muse, Tate & Furst, a Dallas-based private-equity firm, and Booth Creek Management. Hicks, Muse bought the remainder of ConAgra's stake in 2004.

Purchase by JBS
On July 12, 2007, JBS purchased Swift & Company in a US$1.5-billion, all-cash deal. The acquisition made the newly consolidated JBS Swift Group the largest beef processor in the world. Prior to the deal, JBS had a market capitalization of US$4.2 billion and sales revenue of $2.1 billion, and operated in 23 plants in Brazil and five in Argentina.

On July 11, 2007, the Swift companies had also completed several tender offers and consent solicitations for financing notes. These included 10⅛% senior notes due 2009 and 12½% senior subordinated notes due January 1, 2010, both issued by Swift & Company, 11% senior notes due 2010 issued by S&C Holdco 3 and 10¼% convertible senior subordinated notes due 2010 issued by Swift Foods Company.

In 2008, JBS purchased the beef operations of Smithfield Foods for $565 million. JBS also announced in 2008 its intention to buy National Beef Packing Company for $560 million, but canceled the plan after the U.S. Department of Justice raised antitrust concerns.

In 2009, JBS USA acquired 63% of Pilgrim's Pride Chicken Company and shortened the name to simply Pilgrim's. JBS subsequently increased its ownership share to 75.3%.

In 2009, JBS USA Holdings, a Delaware company which operates at 1770 Promontory Circle Greeley CO and had André Nogueira de Souza as CFO, filed notice with the SEC that it desired to float an IPO, and listed 38 subsidiaries. Four accounting firms were listed on the Prospectus, the last to file being BDO Seidman LLP of Dallas TX on 21 July 2009. On 22 July 2009, BDO filed notice with the SEC that unaudited statements had been filed and that they were not endorsed by BDO.  This torpedoed the 2009 IPO of JBS USA.

On October 18, 2012, JBS USA announced it would take over management of XL Foods' Lakeside beefpacking plant in Brooks, Alberta, for 60 days with an exclusive option to buy XL Foods' Canada and US operations. On January 14, 2013, JBS USA completed the purchase of the Brooks facility, a second XL beef facility in Calgary, Alberta, and a feedyard.

In July 2015, JBS USA purchased the U.S. pork processing business of Cargill Meat Solutions for $1.45 billion.

Immigration raids

In December 2006, six of the company's meat-packing facilities in Colorado, Nebraska, Texas, Utah, Iowa, and Minnesota were raided by U.S. Immigration and Customs Enforcement officials, resulting in the apprehension of 1,282 undocumented immigrants from Mexico, Guatemala, Honduras, El Salvador, Peru, Laos, Sudan, and Ethiopia, and nearly 200 of them were criminally charged after a ten-month investigation into identity theft.

Amazon deforestation and net-zero pledge
In March 2021, JBS pledged to reach net-zero greenhouse emissions by 2040- the first global meat company to do so. This followed evidence from investigative journalist Dom Phillips of links in the JBS supply chain to illegal deforestation in the Amazon. The company pledged to eliminate illegal deforestation, including in the threatened Cerrado region, from its supply chains by 2030.

Food safety and quality issues
The beef products were produced on April 21 and 22, 2009, and were shipped to distributors and retail establishments in Arizona, California, Colorado, Florida, Illinois, Michigan, Minnesota, Nebraska, Oregon, South Carolina, Tennessee, Texas, Utah, and Wisconsin.

On November 4, 2010, the Federal Motor Carrier Safety Administration ordered JBS Carriers, a subsidiary of JBS, to install electronic on-board recorders on their trucks after a compliance review found "serious violation" of federal hours of service.

On December 2, 2010, JBS announced that it would use Arrowsight, a remote video auditing company, to monitor proper sanitation to prevent cross contamination during processing.  They also use Arrowsight to monitor their live cattle for proper animal welfare practices.  These programs have shown great success.

The Grain Inspection, Packers and Stockyards Administration assessed a $175,000 civil penalty against JBS/Swift on December 22, 2010, for violations of the Packers and Stockyards Act by failing to disclose when missing Fat-O-Meat’er data had prevented JBS from calculating the lean percentage of a particular pork carcass or carcasses in a seller's lot, and substituting an undisclosed lean value for pork carcasses with missing data when calculating carcass-merit payment for hogs delivered to JBS’ Worthington, MN, Marshalltown, IA, and Louisville, KY, processing plants. The Packers and Stockyards Act is a fair trade practice and payment protection law that promotes fair and competitive marketing environments for the livestock, meat, and poultry industries.

Coronavirus outbreak
The JBS facility in Greeley, Colorado came into national focus during the COVID-19 outbreak when at least 50 workers tested positive by April 10, 2020, and two workers had died of the disease.  By April 14 a third worker had died of COVID-19. US President Donald Trump referred to the case in the daily White House briefing on April 10. All workers were supposed to be tested during the Easter holidays, with the plant being closed until April 24, 2020.  Testing of all did not take place over Easter; rather, a JBS company spokesman announced that workers would be quarantined. The plant reopened after a 9-day closure. By April 15, 102 workers had tested positive for the coronavirus, and four had died. Outbreaks of COVID-19 have also been found in six other JBS beef processing plants, in Souderton, Pennsylvania; Plainwell, Michigan; Green Bay, Wisconsin; Cactus, Texas; Grand Island, Nebraska; and Hyrum, Utah.

The United States House Select Oversight Subcommittee on the Coronavirus Crisis released a report in May of 2022 detailing the relationship between the Trump administration and the meat packing industry during the COVID-19 pandemic. The report describes the CEO of JBS (along with the CEOs of Tyson and Smithfield) asking the secretary of agriculture, Sonny Perdue, about elevating the need for workers to stay present at work, despite the risk of working in close quarters during the pandemic.

Cyberattack

JBS USA was the target of a cyberattack in May 2021. The attack disrupted all JBS facilities in the United States.

See also
 Cactus, Texas, location of a JBS meatpacking plant
 Impact of the COVID-19 pandemic on the meat industry in the United States
 Porter Jarvis, chairman and president of Swift & Co., 1955–1967
 Swift Packing Company building (Sioux City, Iowa), listed in the National Register of Historic Places, now demolished

References

External links

Official website
Booklet "For Variety" with Swift & Company recipes
Swift & Company History
A Nations Meat. 1940 Swift & Company promotional film

JBS S.A. subsidiaries
American companies established in 1855
Food and drink companies established in 1855
Meat packing companies based in Omaha, Nebraska
Food manufacturers of the United States
Meat processing in the United States
Companies based in Greeley, Colorado
Former components of the Dow Jones Industrial Average
American subsidiaries of foreign companies
1855 establishments in Massachusetts
Batista family
Meat packers
Meat processing in Canada
Meat companies of Canada